Curse on This Country: The Rebellious Army of Imperial Japan is a 2016 history book by Danny Orbach, a professor at Hebrew University in Jerusalem. It deals with a variety of rebellions by the Imperial military though the 19th and early 20th century. It argues that a culture of disobedience and rebellion existed in the Japanese army, deriving from the tradition of the shishi (warriors of high aspirations), rebellious samurai active in the 1860s. It preserved itself and expanded over decades, due to political conditions, historical circumstances and the institutional development of the Imperial Japanese Army. It was fed by enduring leniency to right-wing rebels as long as their motives were "pure".

The book is tracing this culture of military insubordination through its earliest manifestations, exploring such incidents as the Taiwan Expedition (1874), the Satsuma Rebellion (1877), and the assassinations of Queen Min (1895) and Zhang Zuolin (1928), as well as terrorist activities of group such as the Cherry Blossom Society (1931) and the Young Officers Movement (1936). Finally, it argues that the Japanese Army's culture of disobedience helped to push the country towards unbridled imperialism, entanglement in China and finally the Pacific War.

References

External links
 Google books link

Books about military history
Books about Japan
2017 non-fiction books
Cornell University Press books
History books about the Empire of Japan
Works about Japan